Winifred Elliott known as Freda Elliott is a former Irish international lawn bowler.

In 1986 she won gold medal in the pairs at the 1986 Commonwealth Games in Edinburgh with Margaret Johnston.

She has won five Irish National Bowls Championships titles.

References

Living people
Female lawn bowls players from Northern Ireland
Commonwealth Games medallists in lawn bowls
Commonwealth Games gold medallists for Northern Ireland
Bowls players at the 1986 Commonwealth Games
Year of birth missing (living people)
Medallists at the 1986 Commonwealth Games